Gennady Timofeyevich Chetin (1 February 1943 – 2002) was a Russian bantamweight weightlifter. He competed at the 1968 and 1972 Summer Olympics and finished in fourth and third place, respectively. He became a world champion in 1971 and set three ratified world records in the total: in 1968, 1971 and 1973.

Chetin was born in a small village in the Urals. He took up weightlifting aged 16, when he lost his parents and was sent to an orphanage. In 1964 he moved from Perm to Yalta and then to Shakhty, to train under Rudolf Plyukfelder. The same year he finished third at the Soviet championships, and later returned to Perm. He won the national titles in 1968–69, 1971–72 and 1976.

Chetin semi-retired between 1973 and 1976 to recover from alcoholism. In the late 1970s he moved from Perm to a friend in Uzbekistan. There he first worked as a farmer and ferryman, but then started competing in powerlifting and coaching the Uzbekistan weightlifting team. In 1992, aged 49, he won a European title and a bronze medal at the world powerliting championships. He died 10 years later.

References

1943 births
2002 deaths
Russian male weightlifters
Olympic weightlifters of the Soviet Union
Weightlifters at the 1968 Summer Olympics
Weightlifters at the 1972 Summer Olympics
Olympic bronze medalists for the Soviet Union
Olympic medalists in weightlifting
Soviet male weightlifters
Medalists at the 1972 Summer Olympics
European Weightlifting Championships medalists
World Weightlifting Championships medalists
People from Kudymkarsky District
Sportspeople from Perm Krai